Woodcrest is a census-designated place (CDP) in Riverside County, California, United States. The population was 14,347 at the 2010 census, up from 8,342 at the 2000 United States Census. The adjacent city of Riverside lists Woodcrest as an area for potential annexation.

History
The Woodcrest area was initially populated by dry land grain farmers in the late 19th century. In 1894, the population had grown enough for the Riverside County Board of Supervisors to establish a school in the area, and on February 6 of that year they authorized the Oak Glen School District.

In 1905 the first subdivision, the Oak Glen Tract, was created.  The House Heights tract was formed in April 1924, and in May the Fertile Acres tract was created near the current Washington Street and Van Buren intersection. In February 1926, the first of five subdivisions with the name Woodcrest Acres was formed, and the name “Woodcrest” was subsequently given to the post office that was established later that year.  Although the post office was closed in 1936, the Woodcrest name continued to be used to refer to the area from then on.

Water in the Woodcrest area became more affordable after the voters of Riverside, Corona, Lake Elsinore and surrounding unincorporated areas approved the formation of the Western Municipal Water District in 1955.  Landowners began diversifying agriculture in the area.  Although citrus groves within Riverside city limits were on the decline, groves in the Woodcrest area began to expand.

Beginning in the 1980s, population pressures and the availability of cheaper land resulted in the decline of agriculture in the Woodcrest area. Today, most orange groves in Woodcrest have given way to development.  The citrus industry that was the foundation of Riverside and surrounding communities has nearly disappeared.

Etymology
"Wood" was the name, or part of the name, of several prominent property owners in the area, and the word was combined with "crest" because the original Woodcrest Acres tract was at the crest of the hills in the area. Susan Wood owned property around the current Wood Road, and is the person for whom the road was named in 1916. For many years, one of the main routes from Riverside out to Woodcrest was referred to as Woodard Grade, or sometimes Woodward Grade, but the name was later lost when the county realigned the route with current day Washington Street. Additionally, two real estate promoters in the area were named Marie and Charles Wood.

Geography
Woodcrest is located at  (33.883366, -117.363825).

Woodcrest is also an equestrian community with many of its residences owning ranches and horses. However, many new housing developments are being built in Woodcrest due to the increasing population of Riverside.

Demographics

2010
At the 2010 census Woodcrest had a population of 14,347. The racial makeup of Woodcrest was 10,418 (72.6%) White, 716 (5.0%) African American, 69 (0.5%) Native American, 715 (5.0%) Asian, 41 (0.3%) Pacific Islander, 1,716 (12.0%) from other races, and 672 (4.7%) from two or more races. Hispanic or Latino of any race were 4,113 persons (28.7%).

The census reported that 14,149 people (98.6% of the population) lived in households, 106 (0.7%) lived in non-institutionalized group quarters, and 92 (0.6%) were institutionalized.

There were 4,382 households, 1,741 (39.7%) had children under the age of 18 living in them, 2,935 (67.0%) were opposite-sex married couples living together, 468 (10.7%) had a female householder with no husband present, 256 (5.8%) had a male householder with no wife present.  There were 209 (4.8%) unmarried opposite-sex partnerships, and 25 (0.6%) same-sex married couples or partnerships. 507 households (11.6%) were one person and 215 (4.9%) had someone living alone who was 65 or older. The average household size was 3.23.  There were 3,659 families (83.5% of households); the average family size was 3.45.

The age distribution was 3,445 people (24.0%) under the age of 18, 1,502 people (10.5%) aged 18 to 24, 3,191 people (22.2%) aged 25 to 44, 4,449 people (31.0%) aged 45 to 64, and 1,760 people (12.3%) who were 65 or older.  The median age was 39.9 years. For every 100 females, there were 99.6 males.  For every 100 females age 18 and over, there were 98.0 males.

There were 4,622 housing units at an average density of 405.1 per square mile, of the occupied units 3,896 (88.9%) were owner-occupied and 486 (11.1%) were rented. The homeowner vacancy rate was 2.1%; the rental vacancy rate was 3.7%.  12,481 people (87.0% of the population) lived in owner-occupied housing units and 1,668 people (11.6%) lived in rental housing units.

2000
At the 2000 census there were 8,342 people, 2,550 households, and 2,198 families in the CDP. The racial makeup of the CDP was 81.0% White, 4.6% African American, 1.2% Native American, 3.5% Asian, 0.2% Pacific Islander, 5.8% from other races, and 3.6% from two or more races. Hispanic or Latino of any race were 16.7%.

Of the 2,550 households 38.7% had children under the age of 18 living with them, 72.2% were married couples living together, 9.5% had a female householder with no husband present, and 13.8% were non-families. 9.5% of households were one person and 3.3% were one person aged 65 or older.  The average household size was 3.2 and the average family size was 3.4.

The age distribution was 28.2% under the age of 18, 8.0% from 18 to 24, 24.4% from 25 to 44, 29.5% from 45 to 64, and 9.9% 65 or older.  The median age was 39 years. For every 100 females, there were 98.0 males.  For every 100 females age 18 and over, there were 93.9 males.

The median household income was $80,269 and the median family income  was $83,125. Males had a median income of $66,473 versus $43,607 for females. The per capita income for the CDP was $27,901.  About 6.2% of families and 8.8% of the population were below the poverty line, including 10.1% of those under age 18 and 1.7% of those age 65 or over.

Government

References

Bibliography
Gunther, Jane Davies. Riverside County, California, Place Names; Their Origines and Their Stories, Rubidoux Printing Co, Riverside, CA, 1984.  LOC Catalog: 84-72920.
Patterson, Tom. A Colony For California, Second Edition, The Museum Press of the Riverside Museum Associates, Riverside, California, 1996. LOC catalog: 96-70106. .

Citations and Notes

Census-designated places in Riverside County, California
Census-designated places in California